Datuk Chin Phui Kong was a Malaysian world-renowned ichthyologist, retired civil servant, author, and World War II secret agent and veteran.

Taxon named in his honor 
Betta chini, 
Osteochilus chini and 
Neogastromyzon chini 
are among the freshwater fish named after him.

Early life 
Chin was born in Sandakan, British North Borneo (now known as Sabah; part of Malaysia), in 1923. He attended Chung Hwa primary school in Sandakan before being sent by his family to Guangzhou, China, for secondary school in 1941. He is stranded in China for a few years after World War II breaks out.

World War II

Commando training 
The British approached Chin and other Malayan and Borneoan students who were stranded in China in 1944 because of their trilingual ability; Malay, English, and Mandarin. They are recruited to a joint Sino-British task force, and Chin willingly enlists because he had no other choice at the time. Unaware of the nature of the task force to which he was assigned, the students were dispatched to India or Ceylon (now known as Sri Lanka) to receive commando training from the British military. Chin was trained as a commando at the Eastern Warfare School in Poona, India, before being sent to Ceylon for jungle training. Chin was then commissioned as a Second lieutenant in the British Indian Army and assigned to Force 136's Dragon Six unit before receiving parachute and demolition training in India.

Malaya 
Chin was assigned to a group of five Force 136 agents in June 1945, including two other Borneoans, Ho Su Shen (father of Datuk Ho Jia Lit, Liberal Democratic Party deputy secretary-general) and Liang Shi Ming. Their mission is to parachute into Perak to assist and train Malayan Peoples' Anti-Japanese Army (MPAJA) guerillas, as well as to prepare Malaya for British forces to arrive. On 12 June 1945, he and four other agents boarded a bomber plane from Calcutta for 12 hours before jumping into Bidor, Perak. Chin recalled seeing a smoke signal before jumping out of the plane in an audio interview with the National Archives of Singapore in 2005. The team then walked for two hours before arriving at the MPAJA camp. Chin Peng is the commander of the camp where Chin arrived.

Chin was tasked with interacting with Orang Asli from the Sakai tribe in addition to training MPAJA guerillas. He spent three months in the jungle before the Japanese surrendered on 2 September 1945. He took part in the Ipoh victory parade before reporting to Force 136 in Kuala Lumpur for his next mission. Force 136 was disbanded in 1946, and Chin was honourably discharged from military service with the rank of First lieutenant at the same time.

Ichthyology 
Several months after World War II ended, Chin return to China to continue his study. He was working as a government official in Fuzhou for a month before been accepted to further his study in Bachelor of Science in Marine biology at Amoy University (now known as Xiamen University). Chin returned to Malaya in 1950 and applied to work for the British colonial fisheries department, where he remained until his retirement in 1978. He is the Director of the Department of Fisheries Sabah, which is the highest position he holds. He is well-known in the field of Ichthyology, having written multiple books and co-authored several others. To recognise his contributions to the field, he was awarded a Datukship, and several fish species were named after him (e.g. Betta chini, Osteochilus chini and Neogastromyzon chini).

His book is regarded as a national treasure, and his work was included as a text book for higher education institutions in Malaysia by then-Prime Minister Mahathir Mohamed. His journals has also been published by the International Development Research Centre and the Food and Agriculture Organization.

Taxon described by him
See :Category:Taxa named by Chin Phui-Kong

Later work 
Chin was actively involved in writing about ichthyology after retiring from the government, and he was also involved in nature and history programmes. He was also elected for three terms as president of The Sabah Society, a non-profit organisation that preserves historical records about Sabah.

Honours

Honours of Malaysia 

  :
  Knight Commanders of the Order of Kinabalu (PGDK) – Datuk
  Member of the Order of Kinabalu (ADK)
  Grand Star of the Order of Kinabalu (BSK)

International honours 

  Taiwan:
  China War Memorial Medal
 Honorable certificate
  United Kingdom:
  Pacific Star

Works 
Chin is the author or co-author of several textbooks and scientific journals. Among his works are:

Books 
 New species of fresh-water catfishes from North Borneo (1959). Co-author with Robert F. Inger.
 The fresh-water fishes of North Borneo (1962). Co-author with Robert F. Inger.
 Prawn otter trawl fishery in Sabah, Malaysia (1967)
 Some aspects of oyster culture in Sabah (1975)
 Oyster culture development in Sabah (1977)
 The prawn fisheries of Sabah, Malaysia (1978). Co-author with Arthur C. Simpson.
 Marine food fishes and fisheries of Sabah (1998)
 My field trip to Ulu Kinabatangan, North Borneo, with Robert Inger (2010)

Articles/Journal 
 A study on the fisheries development planning systems of Malaysia
 Some aspects of oyster culture in Sabah
 Technical Consultation on Shrimp By-Catch Use

Notes

References 

Commanders of the Order of Kinabalu
Special Operations Executive personnel
British Indian Army officers